Bükkszék is a small village in the north of Hungary, near the town of Eger. It is located in Pétervására District of Heves County. The village became famous for its Salvus spa water in the middle of the last century.

External links
 Official website 
 Aerialphotographs from Bükkszék
 Salvus spa 
 Photos from Bükkszék
 Bükkszék at funiq.hu 

Populated places in Heves County
Spa towns in Hungary